The list of Stockholm School of Economics alumni includes notable graduates, professors and administrators affiliated with Stockholm School of Economics.

Business 
 Jan Carlzon, former CEO of SAS Group
 Fredrik Eklund, real estate broker
 Erik Engstrom, CEO of Reed Elsevier 
 Christer Gardell, CEO of AB Custos and founder of Cevian Capital
 Reinhold Geijer, head of the Nordic Region for The Royal Bank of Scotland
 Per Olof Loof, CEO of KEMET Corporation
 Ruben Rausing, founder of liquid food packaging company Tetra Pak
 Charlotte Strömberg, CEO Nordic branch of JLL
 Oscar Swartz, founder of Internet service provider Bahnhof

Economics 
 Eli Heckscher, political economist, economic historian and co-developer of the Heckscher–Ohlin model
 Gunnar Myrdal, Nobel laureate economist, sociologist, and politician
 Bertil Ohlin, Nobel laureate economist, politician and co-developer of the Heckscher–Ohlin model

Politics 
 Margaretha af Ugglas, former Moderate Party politician and previous Minister of Foreign Affairs
 Magdalena Andersson, former prime minister of Sweden and head of the Swedish Social Democratic Party
 Erik Åsbrink, politician of the Swedish Social Democratic Party and former Minister of Finance
 Klas Eklund, economist and writer
 Ali Esbati, former chairman of Young Left, member of the Swedish Parliament for Vänsterpartiet
 Stefan Ingves, Governor of Sveriges Riksbank
 Olof Johansson, former leader of the Swedish Centre Party
 Erik Lakomaa, political consultant and strategist for the no-campaign in the Swedish 2003 Euro referendum
 Mikael Odenberg, politician of the Moderate Party; former Minister of Defence
 Per Westerberg, former Speaker of the Riksdag

Culture and entertainment 
 Alexander Bard, musician and writer
 Jonas Hassen Khemiri, novelist and playwright
 Kristian Luuk, comedian and television host
 Niklas Modig, best-selling author and management speaker
 Lars Nittve, art critic and director of Moderna Museet
 Johan Renck, director and musician
 Max Tegmark, physicist and author

Academics 
 Evert Gummesson, professor of marketing and management

See also 
:Category:Stockholm School of Economics alumni
:Category:Academic staff of the Stockholm School of Economics

References

Stockholm School of Economics
Stockholm School of Economics
Stockholm